Wang Yafan was the defending champion, but lost to compatriot Wang Xiyu in the first round.

Heather Watson won the title, defeating qualifier Leylah Annie Fernandez in the final, 6–4, 6–7(8–10), 6–1.

Seeds

Draw

Finals

Top half

Bottom half

Qualifying

Seeds

Qualifiers

Lucky loser

Draw

First qualifier

Second qualifier

Third qualifier

Fourth qualifier

Fifth qualifier

Sixth qualifier

References

External links
 Main draw
 Qualifying draw

Womb
Abierto Mexicano Telcel - Women's Singles